Finley Air Force Station is a closed United States Air Force General Surveillance Radar station. It was closed in 1979 by the Air Force, and turned over to the Federal Aviation Administration (FAA).

Today the site is part of the Joint Surveillance System (JSS), designated by NORAD as  Western Air Defense Sector (WADS) Ground Equipment Facility.

History 
Finley Air Force Station was part of the last batch of twenty-three radar stations constructed as part of the Air Defense Command permanent network.  It was activated in April 1951, and declared  completely operational in late 1952, and initially the station functioned as a Ground control intercept (GCI) and warning station.  As a GCI station, the squadron's role was to guide interceptor aircraft toward unidentified intruders picked up on the unit's radar scopes.

The 785th Aircraft Control and Warning Squadron began operations with an AN/FPS-3 search radar and AN/FPS-4 from the site in April 1952. In 1957 an AN/FPS-6 replaced the AN/FPS-4 height-finder radar, and an AN/FPS-8 search radar saw brief service. At the end of 1958 this site was operating an AN/FPS-20 radar. A second height-finder (AN/FPS-6B?) was added during 1959.

At the end of 1959 Finley AFS joined the Semi Automatic Ground Environment (SAGE) system, initially feeding data to DC-20 at Malmstrom AFB, Montana.  After joining, the squadron was redesignated as the 785th Radar Squadron (SAGE) on 15 January 1960.  SAGE data was switched to DC-10 at Duluth AFS, Minnesota in 1963.  The radar squadron provided information 24/7 the SAGE Direction Center where it was analyzed to determine range, direction altitude speed and whether or not aircraft were friendly or hostile.

In 1962 Finley operated an AN/FPS-35 search radar plus AN/FPS-6 and AN/FPS-90 height-finder radars. The AN/FPS-6 was removed in 1969. Over the years, the equipment at the station was upgraded or modified to improve the efficiency and accuracy of the information gathered by the radars.

In addition to the main facility, Finley operated four unmanned AN/FPS-14 (P-29A/B) and AN/FPS-18 (P-29C/D) Gap Filler sites:
 Sheyenne, ND     (P-29A) 
 Grafton, ND      (P-29B) 
 Valley City, ND  (P-29C) 
 Middle River, MN (P-29D) 

Over the years, the equipment at the station was upgraded or modified to improve the efficiency and accuracy of the information gathered by the radars. The site was transferred to the Tactical Air Command in October 1979 with the inactivation of Aerospace Defense Command, being assigned to ADTAC. The 785th Radar Squadron (SAGE) was inactivated, and radar operations at Finley AFS (Z-29) ceased, on 30 December 1979 when a new Joint Surveillance System (JSS)  was activated at the former GATR site about a mile to the northwest.

The new Finley JSS site (Z-303/J-75) began operations with an FAA ARSR-3 search radar and an Air Force AN/FPS-116 height-finder radar (removed c. 1988). That site now operates an ARSR-4. The main station equipment, buildings, fixtures, furnishings, and land was auctioned off in public auction on 9 July 2000.  It is now being demolished.

Air Force units and assignments

Units
 Constituted as the 785th Aircraft Control and Warning Squadron
 Activated on 10 April 1951
 Redesignated as 785th Radar Squadron (SAGE) on 15 January 1960
 Inactivated on 1 January 1980

Assignments
 543d Aircraft Control and Warning Group, 10 April 1951
 31st Air Division, 6 February 1952
 29th Air Division, 16 February 1953
 31st Air Division, 1 March 1956
 29th Air Division, 1 January 1959
 Grand Forks Air Defense Sector, 1 April 1959
 Duluth Air Defense Sector, 4 September 1963
 29th Air Division, 1 April 1966
 28th Air Division, 15 September 1969
 24th Air Division, 19 November 1969 - 1 January 1980

Commanders
 Lt. Col. William Pruit c. 1969-1971
 Major Michael Pennefather c. 1972-1974

See also
 List of USAF Aerospace Defense Command General Surveillance Radar Stations
 List of United States Air Force aircraft control and warning squadrons

References

 Cornett, Lloyd H. and Johnson, Mildred W., A Handbook of Aerospace Defense Organization  1946 - 1980,  Office of History, Aerospace Defense Center, Peterson AFB, CO (1980)
 
 Information for Finley AFS, ND

External links
 US Air Defense Radar museum

Installations of the United States Air Force in North Dakota
Semi-Automatic Ground Environment sites
Air Defense Command radar stations
Buildings and structures in Steele County, North Dakota
1952 establishments in North Dakota
1979 disestablishments in North Dakota
Military installations established in 1952
Military installations closed in 1979